CKAY may refer to:

CKAY-FM, a Canadian radio station
CJSU-FM, a Canadian station previously known as CKAY
Ckay1, American music composer, arranger, and producer
CKay, Nigerian singer and producer best known for "Love Nwantiti"